In decision theory, a decision rule is a function which maps an observation to an appropriate action. Decision rules play an important role in the theory of statistics and economics, and are closely related to the concept of a strategy in game theory.

In order to evaluate the usefulness of a decision rule, it is necessary to have a loss function detailing the outcome of each action under different states.

Formal definition 
Given an observable random variable X over the probability space , determined by a parameter θ ∈ Θ, and a set A of possible actions, a (deterministic) decision rule is a function δ : → A.

Examples of decision rules 
 An estimator is a decision rule used for estimating a parameter. In this case the set of actions is the parameter space, and a loss function details the cost of the discrepancy between the true value of the parameter and the estimated value. Thus, the cost function is the sum of squared error, and one would aim to minimize this cost. Once the cost function is defined,  could be chosen, for instance, using some optimization algorithm.
 Out of sample prediction in regression and classification models.

See also 
 Admissible decision rule
 Bayes estimator
 Classification rule
 Scoring rule

Decision theory